In military terms, 52nd Division or 52nd Infantry Division may refer to:

 Infantry divisions 
 52nd Reserve Division (German Empire)
 52nd Infantry Division (German Empire)
 52nd Infantry Division (Wehrmacht)
 52nd Division (Imperial Japanese Army)
 52nd Rifle Division (Soviet Union)
 52nd (Lowland) Division (United Kingdom)
 52nd Infantry Division (United States)